For a Woman (original title: Pour une femme) is a 2013 French drama film directed by Diane Kurys.

Plot
In the 1980s, following the death of their mother, sisters Anne (Sylvie Testud) and Tania (Julie Ferrier) clean out their mother's belongings. Coming across a man's ring among her mother's jewellery Anne, who is a filmmaker, becomes intrigued and begins researching and writing a story about the ring. She eventually discovers a photo of her estranged uncle Jean wearing the ring while posing with her mother and sister.

In 1946, just after World War II Russian immigrants Léna and Michel arrive in Paris after escaping a concentration camp and crossing through the Alps. They apply for French citizenship as Michel was raised in France and fought for the French Foreign Legion. Léna reveals she is pregnant and gives birth to a girl the couple name Tania. In Lyon the couple make inroads with the French communist community. After they are successful in their bid for citizenship Michel opens a clothing shop making custom suits. He is interrupted one day by Léna who tells him a man claiming to be his brother, Jean, has showed up on their doorstep. Michel embraces Jean and treats him as one of the family but later reveals to Léna that he is unsure if the man actually is his brother as his brother Jean was only 9 when he left home and he can't remember what he looked like. He also becomes suspicious when Jean's story of how he came to Paris changes repeatedly.

Jean soon makes himself indispensable to Michel, helping him to procure hard to find cloth and transforming his business to ready-to-wear instead of custom made suits. As a result of his newfound success Michel buys a car, a fridge and For a Woman perfume for Léna.

While out for a stroll Léna reveals to Jean that her marriage to Michel was a sham; arriving at a concentration camp, the guard in charge recognized Michel and told him he could leave. Michel then asked if he could bring his fiancée with him and proposed to Léna without knowing her. While walking Jean realizes he is being followed but manages to escape. Eventually returning home he tells Michel that he still works for the USSR army returning soldiers who have gone AWOL.

Léna begins to feel attracted to Jean and eventually kisses him, when she thinks he will leave. He refuses to sleep with her and later fights with his brother over his loyalty to communism which Jean no longer believes in. Frustrated with his brother and sister-in-law he relocates and drops contact with his family.

Michel is approached by the police who tell him his brother is wanted for murder after killing an innocent man. Léna is finally approached by a friend of Jean's who gives her an envelope to give to him and tells her where he is. Léna goes to visit him and he reveals that his actual job is finding and killing nazis before they can escape Europe. He now plans to use the money in the envelope Léna delivered to go to Palestine. Before he leaves however he and Léna have sex. Despite Léna wanting to leave to be with him, Jean tells her to stay with his brother. However, as she is leaving the hotel she sees police and goes back to Jean's hotel room to warn him. The two manage to escape but need Michel's help to cross the border. Despite Michel's anger over Jean and Léna's relationship, he does help Jean cross the border by giving him his passport and by bringing Léna's as well, so she may go with him. Léna ultimately decides to stay with Michel.

Despite this, their relationship is fractured when Léna gives birth to Anne the following spring and the two finally end their marriage six years later with Léna raising Anne far from Michel.

In 1990 Anne rushes to Ardèche, where her father has been hospitalized. She tells him that her film about his brother is now opening in Japan. Michel tells her that out of the whole story what he remembers most is falling in love with Léna. Michel dies in hospital and Anne and Tania gather to clear out his home. While there, Tania discovers a bottle of For a Woman perfume, which her father has kept all those years.

Cast
 Benoît Magimel as Michel
 Mélanie Thierry as Lena
 Nicolas Duvauchelle as Jean
 Sylvie Testud as Anne
 Denis Podalydès as Maurice
 Julie Ferrier as Tania
 Clotilde Hesme as Madeleine
 Clément Sibony as Sacha
 Marc Ruchmann as Paul

Critical response
On review aggregator website Rotten Tomatoes, the film has an approval rating of 90%, based on ten reviews, with an average rating of 6.33/10. On Metacritic, which assigns a normalized rating, the film has a score of 59 out of 100, based on 7 critics, indicating "mixed or average reviews".

The Hollywood Reporter's reviewer Boyd van Hoeij stated that the film was "handsomely put together" and found that Armand Amar's film score supported the transitions between temporal levels.

Notes
The film had its roots in director Diane Kurys' coming across an old photograph of her father's mysterious brother, Jean, a decade ago. Her father, said Kurys, 'was always very angry with my uncle, and the two men never spoke - there were insinuations that something had happened involving my mother.' Kurys had been told by her mother, when her mother was dying of cancer in the early 1980s, that at her birth  Kurys' father did not want to touch her, or talk to her. Since the photograph of her uncle Jean had been from some time in 1947, months before Kurys was born, she wondered whether she could have been the child of a liaison between her mother and uncle. The film is Kurys' creative imagining of that possible affair  together with real memories of her parents' troubled marriage.

References

External links
 
 
Official presskit 

2013 films
2010s French-language films
2013 drama films
French drama films
Films directed by Diane Kurys
Films set in Lyon
Films shot in Lyon
2010s French films